The name Local News Service refers to a variety of news resource share services all started in 2008 and 2009. It sometimes does not refer to a specific sharing service but to the category in general. Typically, these services include pooling video crews to cover routine events and sharing helicopters used for newsgathering.

For 2009, the biggest development for local TV was content pooling.

NBC-Fox partnerships are called Local News Service.

History
Since 2000, Fox News, ABC and CBS have been partners in a national news pool partnership.

In January 2009, NBC Local Media and Fox Television Stations set up the first Local News Service with their Philadelphia stations after testing since the summer 2008. Fox and NBC then added other markets where they both own stations.  In March, the first local news pool not formed by the NBC-Fox alliance was formed in Columbus, OH by Media General's WCMH-TV and Sinclair Broadcast Group's WSYX and WTTE.  On April 1, Fox Stations entered into its first pooling agreements without NBC in Phoenix (KSAZ-TV) with Scripps' KNXV-TV and Meredith's KPHO-TV and in Detroit (WJBK) with Scripps's WXYZ-TV.  The Fox (WFLD)-NBC (WMAQ-TV) partnership on May 11 started its Chicago pool its first with outside members: Tribune's WGN-TV and CBS's WBBM-TV. On June 29, 2009, six weeks after the start of the Atlanta group, WGCL-TV exited the pool as they considered it restraining their ability to differentiation. The Orlando local news service launched July 16, 2009 is the first to include a local news cable channel, Central Florida News 13.

Issues
There is some concern that these agreements will cause local news coverage to be overly similar "or will enhance it."  The involved stations claim that it will help the stations by allowing more specialized reporting by not tying up resourcing for routine events.  Many of the stations involved have reduced news staff due to decreased advertising revenue.  Fracturing audiences will continue the revenue decline and the need to continue to reduce costs.  These partnerships are a natural solution along with outsourcing and other partnerships and content sharing to the revenue decline.  However, the member stations may use the local news services as a reason for even more reduction in personnel.  Others say that it will be difficult for rivals to work together.

News share services

a. Also share in an "aerial news footage partnership"
h. Helicopter shares
1. WANF, then called WGCL-TV, dropped out of the news share pool.

Helicopter shares only

See also
Concentration of media ownership
Local marketing agreement
Media cross-ownership in the United States

References

2008 in American television
2009 in American television
2008 introductions
2009 introductions
Television news in the United States